Rose Hill Gymnasium is a 3,200-seat multi-purpose arena on the Rose Hill campus of Fordham University in The Bronx, New York City, New York. The arena, which opened in 1925, is the oldest on-campus venue currently used primarily for an NCAA Division I basketball team and the second-oldest overall (with the oldest being Northeastern University's Matthews Arena, opened in 1910 and currently used for its basketball and hockey teams).  Fordham's volleyball team also used the gym. The Rose Hill Gymnasium has a gothic façade that fits in well with the rest of Fordham University's buildings. The interior design features two high-tech video boards, bleachers that surround all four sides of the court, and additional elevated seating along the courtside. ESPN named this gym one of the four “cathedrals” of college basketball. At the time it was built, it was one of the largest on-campus facilities in the country, earning it the nickname "The Prairie."  The Rose Hill Gymnasium has been the site of many legendary college and high school basketball games, including the final high school game of Lew Alcindor, later known as Kareem Abdul-Jabbar.  During World War II, it was also used as a barracks. New York City Mayor Ed Koch lived in these barracks for a time. As early as 1970 an effort, headed by famed Fordham alumnus Vince Lombardi, was made to build a new arena.  This effort ended with Lombardi's death and the move of head basketball coach "Digger" Phelps to the University of Notre Dame.

Architectural style 
Here are some features that show the gothic revival architectural style:

Arches: The entrance doors to the gymnasium are under one pointed arch. There are also six windows with a similar shape above the main doors.

Buttresses: There are a few buttresses around the windows for exterior support.

Stone-like materials: The main entrance is surrounded by stone and stone carvings.

Parapets with crenelations: There is a small wall, or parapet, that exceeds the edge of the gym's roof and it has cut outs, or crenellations, which were used as fortification in Medieval Castles.

Sculpture elements: Above the main arch to the entrance there is a stone sculpture of a cross and Fordham's emblem.

Tracery: There are ovals and other shapes carved in stone on the windows.

Walls: The exterior front walls are made of rough light fieldstones.

History 
The Gymnasium hosted its first basketball game on January 16, 1925. The game was refereed by Frankie Frisch, a Fordham alumni and New York Giants' second baseman.

During World War 2, this gym was used as a U.S. army barracks to shelter the soldiers and separate them from the general public. On May 11, 1946 President Harry Truman visited this barrack and rang a ship bell that still remains there today. Fordham athletic teams continue to ring this bell after conference championship wins.

Renovations 
The Rose Hill Gymnasium was almost renovated in the early 1970s. Vince Lombardi, a Fordham football alumni, wanted to transform the small gym into a 10,500-seat gym. This plan fell through when Lombardi died in 1970 and the head basketball coach Digger Phelps left Fordham for Notre Dame in 1971. Instead, Fordham University built a separate athletic facility that was attached to the gym. 

In 2018, the Rose Hill Gymnasium basketball court was renamed the “Frank McLaughlin Family Basketball Court,” after alumnus Frank McLaughlin who was a basketball player (1965-1969), athletic director (1985-2012), and assistant coach (1970-1971) for Fordham University. 

In 2019, Caldwell & Walsh Building Construction Inc. renovated the gym floors from old wood to a modern shock-absorbing material. This renovation was rushed and only took one summer to complete.

See also
 List of NCAA Division I basketball arenas

References

External links
Rose Hill Gym - Fordham University Athletics
The Rose Hill Gym (from fordham.edu)

Buildings at Fordham University
College basketball venues in the United States
Sports venues in the Bronx
Fordham Rams
1925 establishments in New York City
Sports venues completed in 1925
College volleyball venues in the United States
Basketball venues in New York City
Volleyball venues in New York City